The fastest times in the swimming events at the Pacific Games (formerly known as the South Pacific Games) are designated as the Pacific Games records in swimming. The events are held in a long course (50 m) pool. The last Games were held in Apia, Samoa in 2019.

All records were set in finals unless noted otherwise.

Long Course (50 m)

Men

Women

Mixed relay

References

Pacific Games
Records
Records
Pacific Games